The Ruthenian Austrian internment was part of the confinement of enemy aliens in Austria during World War I. Central Camp Talerhof (German: Thalerhof) was a concentration camp operated by the Austro-Hungarian imperial government between 1914 and 1917 in the Austrian state of Styria.

Over twenty thousand Eastern Slavic Moscophiles were arrested and imprisoned in the camp and in the fortress of Terezín, Bohemia. The camp housed primarily Russophile individuals and families from Galicia. All were suspected of collaboration with the advancing Imperial Russian Army that had invaded and occupied Galicia at the outset of World War I.

The first group of prisoners was transported to Talerhof by soldiers of Austrian regiment of Graz on September 4, 1914. Until the winter of 1915, there were no barracks in Talerhof; prisoners slept in the open air on the ground.

On November 9, 1914, according to the official report of Field Marshal Schleer, there were 5,700 Ukrainians, Carpatho-Rusyns and Lemkos in Talerhof. In total, 20,000 people were prisoners from September 4, 1914, to May 10, 1917.

In the first year and a half, three thousand prisoners died. In addition, tens of thousands of Ukrainians and Lemkos were victims of reprisals carried out by Austro-Hungarian authorities in the Western Ukraine during World War I. In May 1917, the camp was closed by order of Emperor Karl I of Austria (r. 1916-1918).

See also
Ukrainian Canadian internment
German American internment
Central Labour Camp Jaworzno
Metodyj Trochanovskij

References

Internment camps
Austria-Hungary in World War I
Forced migration
World War I crimes by Austria-Hungary
Anti-Ukrainian sentiment
1914